Christopher Lawrence Keenan (born October 1, 1940) is a Canadian former professional ice hockey left wing. He played in the National Hockey League with the Toronto Maple Leafs, St. Louis Blues, Buffalo Sabres, and Philadelphia Flyers between 1962 and 1971.

Playing career
In his NHL career, Keenan appeared in 234 games.  He scored 38 goals and added 64 assists. He is 12th in Blues all-time playoff scoring with 15 goals in 46 playoff games. He was called up for a pair of games with the Toronto Maple Leafs in 1961-62 before spending six years in the AHL and WHL. When the league expansion in 1967 made journeymen a desirable commodity, Keenan found himself back in the NHL with the St. Louis Blues. He formed a hard-working forward line with Terry Crisp and Jim Roberts.

Keenan scored the first-ever goal in St. Louis Blues history on October 11, 1967 against Cesare Maniago of the Minnesota North Stars. He was also on the ice for Bobby Orr's famous 1970 Stanley Cup Finals clinching goal—a scoring play that began when Orr pinched at the blue line and blocked Keenan's attempt to clear the zone with a pass to Red Berenson.

Keenan was traded to the Buffalo Sabres on November 4, 1970 along with Jean-Guy Talbot for Bobby Baun. His career ended prematurely due to injuries.

Life after NHL
Keenan went on to become president of the North Bay Trappers midget AAA and led the club for 23 years from 1986 to 2009. Keenan and manager Art Tiernay operated the club since the Great North Midget League was formed in 1986.

Personal
Keenan grew up with three sisters. His son Cory played junior hockey for the Kitchener Rangers as a defenceman. Cory was drafted in the sixth round of the 1990 NHL Entry Draft by the Hartford Whalers, and ended up playing professionally in Europe. Cory was on the 1990 Memorial Cup all-star team.

Career statistics

Regular season and playoffs

References

External links
 

1940 births
Living people
Buffalo Sabres players
Canadian ice hockey left wingers
Ice hockey people from Ontario
Kansas City Blues players
Philadelphia Flyers players
Richmond Robins players
Rochester Americans players
Sportspeople from North Bay, Ontario
St. Michael's Buzzers players
St. Louis Blues players
Toronto Maple Leafs players
Toronto St. Michael's Majors players